Jack "Hacksaw" Reynolds (born November 22, 1947) is an American former football player who played for the University of Tennessee, first as a fullback and then moving to linebacker. He was a first-round draft pick by the Los Angeles Rams in the 1970 NFL Draft and played there 11 years before going to the San Francisco 49ers in 1981. He played with the Niners four more years and won two Super Bowls with them: Super Bowl XVI and Super Bowl XIX. He wore the number 64 throughout his career, and played in a total of 13 postseason games, including two Pro Bowls.

Reynolds earned his nickname in 1969 by cutting an abandoned 1953 Chevrolet Bel Air (some accounts claim it was a Porsche) in half with a hacksaw after his previously unbeaten University of Tennessee team returned from an embarrassing 38-0 road loss to Ole Miss.  "I came back to school and I was very upset," Reynolds said. "I had to do something to relieve my frustration."  He decided to turn the abandoned car into a trailer for his newly purchased Jeep.  After working through the night on the project, chewing through 13 hacksaw blades, he returned the next day with some teammates to show off his handiwork.  However, when they arrived, both halves of the car were gone.  For the remainder of his career, the nickname stuck.

After being drafted by the Rams and spending a decade in LA, he was released and signed by Bill Walsh and John McVay as a veteran presence for the defence on a $1 million contract over five years.

Reynolds' enthusiasm for football was such that he would show up at 49ers team breakfasts in full pads and eyeblack. Walsh said "He is consumed with football, even more than any addicted coach". Aside from his intensity, he was also known for being a studious player, turning up to his first training camp with the 49ers with his own projector so he could study film in his room, carrying round a large collection of pencils to take constant notes, and being the only player that the coaches entrusted with a key to the facilities. Further, he once refused to lend a pencil to then-rookie Safety Ronnie Lott, stating that he wouldn't become a success in the NFL until he brought his own pencil to every meeting. Lott would eventually enter the NFL Hall of Fame after a 14-year career. Walsh credited Reynolds as being the most telling personnel move he ever made, stating "Jack gave us leadership and maturity and toughness and set an example for everybody...As strange a guy as he was, he really put us on the map. I think that single addition was the key to our success."

It was a condition of his last professional contract that he would become a coach immediately after retirement. However, he only lasted 12 days, allegedly finding the candid nature of player assessments by fellow coaches "unsettling". He retired from professional football completely after this brief stint.

Reynolds appeared in a non-speaking role in the Simpsons episode "Sunday, Cruddy Sunday" when Dan Marino calls him and former Baltimore Colts defensive lineman Bubba Smith to tackle Homer for intercepting a pass meant for Bart. Reynolds currently splits his time between a house in Miami and another in the Caribbean.

References

1947 births
Living people
American football linebackers
Tennessee Volunteers football players
Los Angeles Rams players
San Francisco 49ers players
National Conference Pro Bowl players
Players of American football from Cincinnati